Grégory Cerdan  (born 28 July 1982) is a French former professional footballer who played as a defender. He played for Le Mans and Guingamp in Ligue 1.

Career
On 9 September 2014, Cerdan rejoined his former club Le Mans FC. He retired in 2016, and joined Le Mans' coaching staff.

References

External links
 
 

Living people
1982 births
Association football defenders
French footballers
Ligue 1 players
Ligue 2 players
Entente SSG players
Le Mans FC players
En Avant Guingamp players